The Adatepe class or Kocatepe class were two destroyers built for the Turkish Navy by the Italian company, Ansaldo of Genoa in 1931.

These ships were the first part of the re-armament program for the Turkish Navy which began after the end of the Greco-Turkish War and the establishment of the Republic of Turkey.

The Adatepe class were based on contemporary Italian  but had guns mounted in single mountings rather than twin turrets of the Italian ships. The hulls were lengthened to accommodate this change and the ships had two funnels rather than the single funnel used by the Italian ships.

Ships

Notes

References

 
Destroyers of the Turkish Navy
Destroyer classes
Ships built by Gio. Ansaldo & C.
Italy–Turkey relations